The following is a list of teams that no longer compete in NBL1.

Defunct teams

See also

List of defunct National Basketball League (Australia) teams

References

External links

NBL teams
NBL1